It's Getting Later All the Time is a 2001 novel by the Italian writer Antonio Tabucchi. It has the form of an epistolary novel, and consists of letters from 17 men to former lovers, and a single letter with the response to all of them.

Reception
Andrew Ervin wrote in The New York Times: "Taken linearly, these letters ... don't make any more sense than scenes in a Fellini movie. But, as with 8 [sic] or Amarcord, to look for logic is to miss the point. ... The subtle relationships between the letters turn out to be more thematic than literal, though they eventually come together in a brilliantly unexpected way."

See also
 2001 in literature
 Italian literature

References

2001 Italian novels
Epistolary novels
Novels by Antonio Tabucchi